The Open Engie Porte du Hainaut is a tournament for professional female tennis players. The event, played on outdoor clay courts, is classified as a $25,000 ITF Women's Circuit tournament and has been held in Denain, France, since 1998. It was previously a $75,000 tournament, from 2003 to 2008.

Past finals

Singles

Doubles

External links
 ITF search
 

ITF Women's World Tennis Tour
Clay court tennis tournaments
Tennis tournaments in France
Recurring sporting events established in 1998